This article is a list of notable individuals who were born in or have lived in Pittsburg, Kansas.

Academia

 Dale R. Corson (1914–2012), physicist
 Samuel Martin (1924–2009), linguist
 Vance Randolph (1892–1980), folklorist

Arts and entertainment

Film, television, and theatre
 Hugh Gillin (1925–2004), actor
 Roy Glenn (1914–1971), actor

Journalism
 Rick Atkinson (1952– ), newspaper journalist, military historian
 Paul White (1902–1955), broadcast journalist
 Brian Williams (1959– ), news anchor

Literature
 Harold Bell Wright (1872–1944), essayist, novelist, playwright
 Gary Zukav (1942– ), spiritualist, self-help writer

Music
 Lee Allen (1927–1994), saxophonist

Other visual arts
 Waylande Gregory (1905–1971), sculptor
 Russell Myers (1938– ), cartoonist
 Scot Sothern (1949– ), photographer
 Ann Woodward (1915–1975), radio actress, showgirl, and socialite

Business
 William N. Deramus III (1915–1989), railroad executive
 Alexander Howat (1876–1945), coal miner, trade union leader
 Kenneth A. Spencer (1902–1960), chemical entrepreneur

Crime
 Dennis Rader (1945– ), serial killer

Military
 Jack William Wintle (1908–1942), U.S. Navy Lieutenant Commander, Navy Cross recipient

Politics

National
 Philip P. Campbell (1862–1941), U.S. Representative from Kansas
 John C. Coughenour (1941– ), U.S. federal judge
 Ronald Earl Longstaff (1941– ), U.S. federal judge
 Edward White Patterson (1895–1940), U.S. Representative from Kansas

State
 Donald L. Allegrucci (1936–2014), Kansas Supreme Court justice
 Terry Calloway (1954– ), Kansas state legislator
 Jacob LaTurner, Kansas State Treasurer-designate
 Arthur C. Mellette (1842–1896), 1st Governor of South Dakota
 Julie Menghini (1964– ), Kansas state legislator
 Robert H. Trent (1936–2012), Wyoming state legislator

Religion
 Ronald Michael Gilmore (1942– ), Roman Catholic prelate

Sports

American football
See also List of Pittsburg State Gorillas head football coaches
 Brad Franchione (1974– ), coach
 Dale Hall (1924–1996), coach
 Dylan Meier (1984–2010), quarterback
 Kerry Meier (1986– ), wide receiver
 Shad Meier (1978– ), tight end
 Steve Quinn (1946– ), center
 Kevin Verdugo (1968– ), coach

Baseball
 P.J. Forbes (1967– ), infielder
 Don Gutteridge (1912–2008), second and third baseman, coach, manager
 Ray Mueller (1912–1994), catcher
 Bill Russell (1948– ), shortstop, coach, manager
 Roy Sanders (1894–1963), pitcher

Other
 Ralph "Wild Red" Berry (1906–1973), pro wrestler
 Ed Nealy (1960– ), basketball forward

See also
 Lists of people from Kansas

References

Pittsburg, Kansas
Pittsburg